The 1968 United States presidential election in South Dakota took place on November 5, 1968, as part of the 1968 United States presidential election. Voters chose four representatives, or electors, to the Electoral College, who voted for president and vice president.

South Dakota was won by former Vice President Richard Nixon (R–California), with 53.27 percent of the popular vote, against Vice President Hubert Humphrey (D–Minnesota), with 41.96 percent of the popular vote. Independent candidate George Wallace would carry five Southern states, but finished with a mere 4.76 percent of South Dakota's popular vote. Although the West River region of South Dakota possessed powerful racial conflicts akin to Wallace's native South – although between Whites and Native Americans rather than between Whites and Blacks – significant anti-Southern feeling amongst its Yankee descendants limited Wallace's appeal even there, and in the East River with fewer Native Americans and a strong Scandinavian-American influence, Wallace possessed generally insignificant appeal. Although he performed reasonably in some West River counties, within the more populous East River Wallace cracked half his national percentage (6.75%) only in Hyde and Sully Counties. Consequently, South Dakota proved Wallace's eighth-weakest state nationally.

Results

Results by county

See also
 United States presidential elections in South Dakota

Notes

References

South Dakota
1968
1968 South Dakota elections